The Tyngsborough Bridge is a steel tied-arch bridge located in Tyngsborough, Massachusetts and carries Route 113 over the Merrimack River. With a span of 547 feet, it has the longest span of any steel rib through arch bridges in Massachusetts. It is also the 2nd oldest steel rib through arch bridge in the state. The bridge is center hinged and features pratt-type trussing.

History
The Tyngsborough Bridge was constructed in 1931 to replace the wooden Whipple truss bridge. The new bridge was sited alongside but not parallel to the older, starting close the old structure on the eastern side of the river but reaching the western side well both of the old bridge. The Tyngsboro Bridge shares its open, braced rib design with the Boston University Bridge.

Starting in 1975 the bridge was rebuilt, but the cost of the construction generated controversy.

 In November 2005, the bridge was closed again for repairs following reports of structural deficiency. The temporary Mabey Panel Bridge was constructed alongside of the main bridge and repairs on the main bridge began in 2009. The repair operation was contracted out to S & R Corp. for $16.4 million, but eventually cost $19 million by the completion of the project. This was partially due to delays with steel girders failing stress tests, which required re-engineering, and the discovery that the original bridge had been constructed with lead paint which required S & R Corp. to take measures to ensure that the paint chips did not fall into the river below. The repairs took three years to complete with the bridge reopening in 2012.

References

Additional sources
 Peter M. Millot, The Lower Merrimack River Valley: an inventory of historic engineering and industrial sites (North Andover, Massachusetts: Merrimack Valley Textile Museum, 1978)

External links
Photographs, 1931-1932

Bridges in Middlesex County, Massachusetts
Bridges completed in 1930
Bridges over the Merrimack River
Steel bridges in the United States
Through arch bridges in the United States
Road bridges in Massachusetts